Volosovo is a rural locality (a selo) in Tolpukhovskoye Rural Settlement, Sobinsky District, Vladimir Oblast, Russia. The population was 256 as of 2010. There are 6 streets.

Geography 
Volosovo is located on the Kolochka River, 30 km northeast of Sobinka (the district's administrative centre) by road. Krutoy Ovrag is the nearest rural locality.

References 

Rural localities in Sobinsky District